The Mid-Continent Railway Museum is a railroad museum in North Freedom, Wisconsin, United States. The museum consists of static displays as well as a  round trip ride aboard preserved railroad cars.

History 
The rail line used by the Mid-Continent Railway Museum is a spur off of the original Chicago and North Western Railway mainline. With the development of the Illinois Iron mine in early 1903, the C&NW sent a team of engineers on July 8, 1903, to survey a route to the iron fields. By August 12, C&NW president Marvin Hughitt had arrived in North Freedom in person to announce that a branchline would be built. A second major mine, the Iroquois Mine (also called the Sauk Mine), was established in October not far from the new rail line. By December 1903, the  branchline was completed at a cost of $40,533.

To support the increasing number of miners in the area, a new town called La Rue was platted, named after William G. La Rue. William La Rue was an area mining pioneer who demonstrated that the latest technological advancements in diamond drill technology could make iron mining in the area economically feasible. The town was surveyed and registered in January 1903, but it was soon realized that its location in the southwest corner of the intersection of present-day Highway W and Diamond Hill Road would prove to be too far from where the mines were developing. By November 1903, the development of the town shifted nearer to the Illinois Mine,  to the south at the present day location of La Rue. At the height of iron mining production, the population of La Rue likely did not exceed 50 people, but the town did include a hotel, lumberyard, church, general store, and two saloons to supply and entertain the several hundred miners living nearby. Another townsite named Oliver was platted just east of La Rue, slightly closer to the Oliver Mining Company-owned Iroquois Mine, but no construction ever occurred.

At its peak, the Illinois Mine was shipping between five and 12 train car loads daily over the C&NW branchline, but La Rue's ironing mining days would be numbered. Costs continued to grow as a result of the water infiltration until finally the Illinois Mine closed in 1908. By this time it was burdened by costs associated with pumping out  of water per minute. With the end of iron mining operations, the town of La Rue quickly disappeared. By 1925, only one building remained: the La Rue tavern, which still stands today.

As the La Rue area iron mining days were ending, the need for quartzite rock was increasing. In 1917, Harbison-Walker Refractories Company established a quarry south of La Rue. Operations continued until 1962 when the quarry ceased operation. The rail line was slated for abandonment soon after.

Meanwhile, in 1959, a group of rail enthusiasts from the Milwaukee area had joined to form the Railroad Historical Society of Milwaukee. With the group's first acquisition of the Consumers Company #701 steam locomotive, the search for a home for their collection began. An agreement was reached with the Hillsboro and Northeastern Railway to operate diesel-powered train rides over their line beginning in 1962 under the name Mid-Continent Railway Museum. When it was learned the North Freedom branchline was available in 1962, the line was quickly purchased and the small collection of cars and locomotives were moved to North Freedom in 1963. By the summer of 1963, the move was finished and repairs to steam locomotive CNW 1385 were completed, allowing steam train rides to be offered for the first time that summer. Train rides have been offered out of North Freedom by the museum every year since and a small rail yard was gradually built to hold the growing collection of preserved rail equipment.

Flooding and reopening 
In June 2008, the museum grounds were inundated by floodwaters of the Baraboo River. The museum closed for repairs until February 2009. The bridge's out-of-service status did not affect the route used by the museum's train rides, but did prevent the movement of rail cars and locomotives to and from the museum via the national rail network. Repairs to the bridge were completed in July 2018.

Operations

Heritage railroad 
The museum operates a heritage railroad which offers passenger excursion trains on a  round trip. Trains leave from North Freedom, pass through the former mining community of La Rue, and turn around at a rock quarry, returning on the same route. The excursions take approximately one hour and operate daily from early June through Labor Day and most weekends in May, September, and October. Roughly 15 minutes are spent at the end of the line to move the locomotive to the opposite end of the train for the return trip to North Freedom. During the ride, a uniformed conductor punches passengers' tickets, shares railroad history, and answers questions.

Special event trains are also offered several times throughout the year, including Autumn Color weekends in the fall, Pumpkin Special runs near Halloween, Santa Express Weekends at the end of November, and the Snow Train in February. During special events, additional ride options are frequently offered such as first class trains, dinner trains, and brunch trains which offer onboard food and beverage service and utilize cars which are more luxurious than the train cars typically used.

For most of the museum's history, nearly all trains were pulled by steam locomotives although since February 2000, all trains have been pulled by diesel-electric locomotives pending the restoration or repair of the museum's steam locomotives.

Collection 
The Mid-Continent Railway Museum's collection emphasizes the preservation of railroad items operated in the upper Midwest from the period of 1880–1916, what the organization refers to as the "Golden Age of Railroading".

Two steam locomotives, Chicago and North Western 1385 and Western Coal and Coke 1, are currently under restoration to federal guidelines. The museum's collection consists of nine steam locomotives, eight diesel locomotives, and over 100 other pieces of rolling stock. The museum has the largest collection of wooden passenger cars in the United States as well as being home to five of only six surviving wooden boxcars built by the Mather Stock Car Company and the nation's last surviving fish car, Wisconsin Fish Commission "Badger Car #2". In 2015, the Museum decided to rationalize their collection by deaccessioning some of their equipment, including most of their disassembled locomotives.

The depot is an original Chicago and North Western Railway depot from the small town of Ableman, now known as Rock Springs, Wisconsin. It was built in 1894 and moved to the museum to its current location in 1965. The depot consists of two seating areas separated by the ticket office, and a gift shop now occupies the former freight room. The interior was extensively renovated following water damage during flooding in June 2008.

In addition to the depot, other railroad structures moved to the museum's location include a crossing shanty, crossing tower, section shed, and water tower. Additional structures have been built new to house and maintain the collection but attempts were made to make the structures appear period appropriate.

Current locomotive roster

Former locomotive roster

Gallery

See also 
 List of heritage railroads in the United States
 List of railway museums

References

External links 

 
 Official Facebook page

Railroad museums in Wisconsin
Heritage railroads in Wisconsin
Museums in Sauk County, Wisconsin
Rail transport articles in need of updating